Ostrocerca dimicki, the hooked forestfly, is a species of spring stonefly in the family Nemouridae. It is found in North America.

References

Nemouridae
Articles created by Qbugbot
Insects described in 1936